Thomas Mayfield may refer to:

 Thomas Edd Mayfield (1926–1958), bluegrass singer and guitarist
 Thomas Jefferson Mayfield (1843–1928), adopted member of the Choinumni branch of the Yokuts tribe